The following outline is provided as an overview of and topical guide to Russia.

The Russian Federation, commonly known as Russia, is the most extensive country in the world, covering , more than an eighth of the Earth's land area.  Russia is a transcontinental country extending across the whole of northern Asia and 40% of Europe; it spans 11 time zones and incorporates a great range of environments and landforms. With 143 million people, Russia is the ninth most populated country. Russia has the world's largest mineral and energy resources, has the world's largest forest reserves, and its lakes contain approximately one-quarter of the Earth's fresh liquid water.

General reference 

 Pronunciation:  
 Common English country name:  Russia
 Official English country name:  The Russian Federation
 Common endonym(s): Россия (Rossiya)
 Official endonym(s):  Российская Федерация (Rossiyskaya Federatsiya)
 Adjectival(s): Russian 
 Demonym(s):
 Etymology: Name of Russia
 International rankings of Russia
 ISO country codes:  RU, RUS, 643
 ISO region codes:  See ISO 3166-2:RU
 Internet country code top-level domain:  .ru, .su and .рф

Geography of Russia 

Geography of Russia
 Russia is: a Country
 Location: transcontinental (lies in both Europe and Asia)
 Eastern Hemisphere
 Northern Hemisphere
 Eurasia
 Europe
 Eastern Europe
 Asia
 North Asia
 Time zones:
 Kaliningrad Time – UTC+02
 Moscow Time – UTC+03
 Samara Time – UTC+04
 Yekaterinburg Time – UTC+05
 Omsk Time – UTC+06
 Krasnoyarsk Time – UTC+07
 Irkutsk Time – UTC+08
 Yakutsk Time – UTC+9
 Vladivostok Time – UTC+10
 Magadan Time – UTC+11
 Kamchatka Time – UTC+12
 Extreme points of Russia
 High:  Mount Elbrus  – highest point in Europe
 Low:  Caspian Sea  – lowest point in Europe
 Land boundaries:  
 
 
 
 
 
 
 , including:
 
 
 
 
 
 
 
 
 
Coastline:  
 Population of Russia: 142,942,000 people (2010 census) – 8th most populous country
 Area of Russia:   – 1st largest country
 Atlas of Russia

Mercator projection distorts Russia's appearance from crescent-like shape (as seen on a globe) into a fish-like or bear-like outline; also making the uninhabited area of Russia (e.g. food-less cold tundra and taiga) look 3-4 times bigger than it already is.

Environment of Russia 

Environment of Russia
 Climate of Russia
 Climate change in Russia
 Environmental issues in Russia
 Climate change in Russia
 Ecoregions in Russia
 Renewable energy in Russia
 Geology of Russia
 National Parks of Russia
 Nature Reserves ("Zapovedniks") in Russia
 Ramsar Wetlands in Russia
 Protected areas of Russia
 Wildlife of Russia
 Fauna of Russia
 Birds of Russia
 Mammals of Russia

Geographic features of Russia 
Fjords in Russia
Glaciers of Russia
Islands of Russia
Lakes of Russia
Caspian Sea (lake with 1.3% salinity, about a third the salinity of seawater. Compare with Great Salt Lake.)
Mountains of Russia
Caucasus Mountains
Ural Mountains
East Siberian Mountains
South Siberian Mountains
Volcanoes in Russia
Plains of Russia
West Siberian Plain
East Siberian Plain
Central Yakutian Plain
Rivers of Russia
Waterfalls of Russia
Valleys of Russia
World Heritage Sites in Russia

Regions of Russia

Central Russia
North Caucasus
Siberia
Russian Far East
Economic regions of Russia

Ecoregions of Russia

List of ecoregions in Russia
 Ecoregions in Russia

Subdivisions of Russia

Subdivisions of Russia

Federal subjects of Russia (83)
Republics of Russia (22)
Oblasts of Russia (46)
Krais of Russia (9)
Autonomous oblasts of Russia (1)
Autonomous okrugs of Russia (4)
Federal cities of Russia (3)
Types of inhabited localities in Russia
List of cities and towns in Russia

Republics of Russia
{| style="margin:1em auto;"
|-
| colspan=3 | 
|-
|
1. Republic of Adygea
2. Altai Republic
3. Republic of Bashkortostan
4. Buryat Republic
5. Republic of Dagestan
6. Republic of Ingushetia
7. Kabardino-Balkar Republic
8. Republic of Kalmykia
|
9. Karachay–Cherkess Republic
10. Republic of Karelia
11. Komi Republic
12. Mari El Republic
13. Republic of Mordovia
14. Sakha (Yakutia) Republic
15. Republic of North Ossetia–Alania
16. Republic of Tatarstan
|
17. Tuva Republic
18. Udmurt Republic
19. Republic of Khakassia
20. Chechen Republic
21. Chuvash Republic

Oblasts of Russia

Krais of Russia

Autonomous oblasts of Russia

Autonomous okrugs of Russia

Federal cities of Russia

Municipalities of Russia

Demographics of Russia

Demographics of Russia
2002 Census

Government and politics of Russia

Politics of Russia
 Form of government: federal semi-presidential republic
 Capital of Russia: Moscow
 Anarchism in Russia
 The Development of Capitalism in Russia
 Controversy in Russia regarding the legitimacy of eastward NATO expansion
 Elections in Russia
 Term limits in Russia
 Liberalism in Russia
 Mass surveillance in Russia
 Opposition to Vladimir Putin in Russia
 Organisations banned in Russia
 Political parties in Russia
 Propaganda in Russia
 Taxation in Russia

Branches of the government of Russia 

Government of Russia

Executive branch of the government of Russia 
 Head of state: President of Russia, Vladimir Putin
 State Council of the Russian Federation (advisory board to the Head of State)
 Presidential Administration of Russia (President's support staff)
 Head of government: Prime Minister of Russia, Mikhail Mishustin
 Public Chamber of Russia
 17 Ministries
 7 Federal Services
 30+ Federal Agencies

Legislative branch of the government of Russia 

 Federal Assembly of Russia (bicameral parliament)
 Upper house: Federation Council of Russia
 Lower house: State Duma

Judicial branch of the government of Russia 

Judiciary of Russia
 Constitutional Court of the Russian Federation
 Supreme Court of Russia

Foreign relations of Russia 

Foreign relations of Russia
 Diplomatic missions of Russia
 Diplomatic missions in Russia
International counter-terrorism operations of Russia

International organization membership 
The Russian Federation is a member of:

Arctic Council
Asia-Pacific Economic Cooperation (APEC)
Association of Southeast Asian Nations (ASEAN) (dialogue partner)
Association of Southeast Asian Nations Regional Forum (ARF)
Bank for International Settlements (BIS)
Black Sea Economic Cooperation Zone (BSEC)
Collective Security Treaty Organization (CSTO)
Commonwealth of Independent States (CIS)
Council of Europe (CE)
Council of the Baltic Sea States (CBSS)
Eurasian Economic Community (EAEC)
Euro-Atlantic Partnership Council (EAPC)
European Bank for Reconstruction and Development (EBRD)
European Organization for Nuclear Research (CERN) (observer)
General Confederation of Trade Unions (GCTU)
Group of Eight (G8)
Group of Twenty Finance Ministers and Central Bank Governors (G20)
International Atomic Energy Agency (IAEA)
International Bank for Reconstruction and Development (IBRD)
International Chamber of Commerce (ICC)
International Civil Aviation Organization (ICAO)
International Criminal Court (ICCt) (signatory)
International Criminal Police Organization (Interpol)
International Development Association (IDA)
International Federation of Red Cross and Red Crescent Societies (IFRCS)
International Finance Corporation (IFC)
International Hydrographic Organization (IHO)
International Labour Organization (ILO)
International Maritime Organization (IMO)
International Mobile Satellite Organization (IMSO)
International Monetary Fund (IMF)
International Olympic Committee (IOC)
International Organization for Migration (IOM) (observer)
International Organization for Standardization (ISO)
International Red Cross and Red Crescent Movement (ICRM)
International Telecommunication Union (ITU)
International Telecommunications Satellite Organization (ITSO)
International Trade Union Confederation (ITUC)
Inter-Parliamentary Union (IPU)
Latin American Integration Association (LAIA) (observer)
Multilateral Investment Guarantee Agency (MIGA)
Nonaligned Movement (NAM) (guest)
Nuclear Suppliers Group (NSG)
Organisation of Islamic Cooperation (OIC) (observer)
Organisation for Economic Co-operation and Development (OECD) (accession state)
Organization for Security and Cooperation in Europe (OSCE)
Organisation for the Prohibition of Chemical Weapons (OPCW)
Organization of American States (OAS) (observer)
Paris Club
Partnership for Peace (PFP)
Permanent Court of Arbitration (PCA)
Shanghai Cooperation Organisation (SCO)
United Nations (UN)
United Nations Conference on Trade and Development (UNCTAD)
United Nations Educational, Scientific, and Cultural Organization (UNESCO)
United Nations High Commissioner for Refugees (UNHCR)
United Nations Industrial Development Organization (UNIDO)
United Nations Institute for Training and Research (UNITAR)
United Nations Mission for the Referendum in Western Sahara (MINURSO)
United Nations Mission in Liberia (UNMIL)
United Nations Mission in the Sudan (UNMIS)
United Nations Observer Mission in Georgia (UNOMIG)
United Nations Operation in Cote d'Ivoire (UNOCI)
United Nations Organization Mission in the Democratic Republic of the Congo (MONUC)
United Nations Security Council (permanent member)
United Nations Truce Supervision Organization (UNTSO)
Universal Postal Union (UPU)
World Customs Organization (WCO)
World Federation of Trade Unions (WFTU)
World Health Organization (WHO)
World Intellectual Property Organization (WIPO)
World Meteorological Organization (WMO)
World Tourism Organization (UNWTO)
World Trade Organization (WTO) (observer)
World Veterans Federation
Zangger Committee (ZC)

Law and order in Russia 

Law of Russia
 Abortion in Russia
 Animal welfare and rights in Russia
 Classified information in Russia
 Constitution of Russia
 Gun control in Russia
 Hunting in Russia
 History of international law in Russia
 Types of legal entities in Russia
 Martial law in Russia

Crime in Russia 
 Crime in Russia
 Cannabis in Russia
 Corruption in Russia
 People accused of bribery in Russia
 Gambling in Russia
 Homicide in Russia
 Mass shootings in Russia
 Massacres in Russia
 Human trafficking in Russia
 Prostitution in Russia

Human rights in Russia 
Human rights in Russia
 Racism in Russia
 LGBT rights in Russia
 Recognition of same-sex unions in Russia
 Freedom of assembly in Russia
 Freedom of religion in Russia
 Media freedom in Russia

Law enforcement in Russia 
Law enforcement in Russia
 Capital punishment in Russia
 Prisons in Russia
 Life imprisonment in Russia

Military of Russia 

Military of Russia
 Command
 Commander-in-chief:President of the Russian Federation
 Russian Armed Forces
 Russian Ground Forces
 Russian Navy
 Russian Aerospace Forces
 Strategic Missile Troops
 Russian Airborne Troops
 Russian Special Operations Forces
 Military history of Russia
 Military ranks of Russia
 Military training in Russia
 Military academies in Russia
 Reserve Officer Training in Russia

Local government in Russia 

Local government in Russia

History of Russia

History of Russia, by period 
 Ancient Russia
 Proto-Indo-Europeans
 Scythians
 Bosporan Kingdom
 Khazaria
 Early East Slavs
 East Slavs
 Rus' Khaganate
 Kievan Rus'
 Mongol invasion of Rus
 Tatar invasions
 Volga Bulgaria
 Golden Horde
 Grand Duchy of Moscow
 Tsardom of Russia
 Russian Empire
 French invasion of Russia
 History of Russia (1894–1917)
 Russia in World War I
 Russian Revolution of 1917
 Russian Civil War
 History of the Soviet Union
 Russian SFSR
 Soviet Union
 Soviet Union in World War II
 World War II casualties of the Soviet Union
 Cold War
 Soviet–Afghan War
 Dissolution of the Soviet Union
 History of Russia (1991–present)
 Russian Federation
 1993 Russian constitutional crisis
 First Chechen War (1994-1995)
 Second Chechen War (1999-2009)
 Insurgency in the North Caucasus (2009-2017)
 Russo-Ukrainian War (outline) (2014–present)
 Annexation of Crimea by the Russian Federation (2014)
 Timeline of the annexation of Crimea by the Russian Federation
 2014 Crimean status referendum
 2014 anti-war protests in Russia
 War in Donbas
 Timeline of the war in Donbas
 2022 Russian invasion of Ukraine
 Timeline of the 2022 Russian invasion of Ukraine
 2022 Russian invasion of Ukraine reactions
 Allegations of child abductions in the 2022 Russian invasion of Ukraine
 Allegations of genocide of Ukrainians in the 2022 Russian invasion of Ukraine
 Anonymous and the 2022 Russian invasion of Ukraine
 2022 anti-war protests in Russia
 Attacks on civilians in the 2022 Russian invasion of Ukraine
 Belarusian involvement in the 2022 Russian invasion of Ukraine
 Chechen involvement in the 2022 Russian invasion of Ukraine
 China and the 2022 Russian invasion of Ukraine
 Collaboration with Russia during the 2022 Russian invasion of Ukraine
 Corporate responses to the 2022 Russian invasion of Ukraine
 Economic impact of the 2022 Russian invasion of Ukraine
 Environmental impact of the 2022 Russian invasion of Ukraine
 Fundraising for Ukraine during the 2022 Russian invasion of Ukraine
 Government and intergovernmental reactions to the 2022 Russian invasion of Ukraine
 Humanitarian impact of the 2022 Russian invasion of Ukraine
 Impact of the 2022 Russian invasion of Ukraine on nuclear power plants
 International sanctions during the 2022 Russian invasion of Ukraine
 Legality of the 2022 Russian invasion of Ukraine
 List of damaged cultural sites during the 2022 Russian invasion of Ukraine
 List of military engagements during the 2022 Russian invasion of Ukraine
 List of monuments and memorials removed following the Russian invasion of Ukraine
 List of streets renamed due to the 2022 Russian invasion of Ukraine
 Non-government reactions to the 2022 Russian invasion of Ukraine
 Nuclear threats during the 2022 Russian invasion of Ukraine
 Open-source intelligence in the 2022 Russian invasion of Ukraine
 Order of battle for the 2022 Russian invasion of Ukraine
 Prelude to the 2022 Russian invasion of Ukraine
 Proposed no-fly zone in the 2022 Russian invasion of Ukraine
 Protests against the 2022 Russian invasion of Ukraine
 2022 rail war in Russia
 Sexual violence in the 2022 Russian invasion of Ukraine
 Speeches by Volodymyr Zelenskyy during the 2022 Russian invasion of Ukraine
 Statements of the Riigikogu 2022 on the Russian invasion of Ukraine
 Ukrainian resistance during the 2022 Russian invasion of Ukraine
 United States and the 2022 Russian invasion of Ukraine
 Use of white phosphorus bombs in the 2022 Russian invasion of Ukraine
 War crimes in the 2022 Russian invasion of Ukraine
 Wikipedia and the 2022 Russian invasion of Ukraine
 Women in the 2022 Russian invasion of Ukraine
 Yachts impacted by international sanctions following the Russian invasion of Ukraine

History of Russia, by year 

1700 - 1701 - 1702 - 1703 - 1704 - 1705 - 1706 - 1707 - 1708 - 1709 - 1710 - 1711 - 1712 - 1714 - 1715 - 1717 - 1718 - 1720 - 1721 - 1722 - 1723 - 1724 - 1725 - 1726 - 1727 - 1729 - 1730 - 1731 - 1732 - 1735 - 1736 - 1739 - 1740 - 1741 - 1742 - 1743 - 1744 - 1745 - 1746 - 1747 - 1750 - 1751 - 1752 - 1754 - 1755 - 1756 - 1757 - 1758 - 1759 - 1760 - 1761 - 1762 - 1763 - 1764 - 1765 - 1767 - 1768 - 1770 - 1771 - 1772 - 1773 - 1774 - 1775 - 1776 - 1778 - 1779 - 1780 - 1781 - 1782 - 1783 - 1784 - 1785 - 1786 - 1787 - 1788 - 1789 - 1790 - 1791 - 1792 - 1793 - 1794 - 1795 - 1796 - 1797 - 1798 - 1799 - 1800 - 1801 - 1802 - 1803 - 1804 - 1805 - 1806 - 1807 - 1808 - 1809 - 1810 - 1811 - 1812 - 1813 - 1814 - 1815 - 1818 - 1821 - 1824 - 1825 - 1828 - 1829 - 1830 - 1831 - 1834 - 1837 - 1840 - 1843 - 1844 - 1845 - 1846 - 1848 - 1849 - 1851 - 1852 - 1853 - 1854 - 1855 - 1856 - 1857 - 1858 - 1859 - 1860 - 1861 - 1862 - 1863 - 1864 - 1865 - 1866 - 1867 - 1868 - 1869 - 1870 - 1872 - 1874 - 1875 - 1876 - 1877 - 1878 - 1879 - 1880 - 1881 - 1882 - 1883 - 1884 - 1885 - 1886 - 1887 - 1888 - 1889 - 1890 - 1891 - 1892 - 1893 - 1894 - 1895 - 1896 - 1897 - 1898 - 1899 - 1900 - 1901 - 1902 - 1903 - 1904 - 1905 - 1906 - 1907 - 1908 - 1909 - 1910 - 1911 - 1912 - 1913 - 1914 - 1915 - 1916 - 1917 - 1918 - 1919 - 1920 - 1921 - 1992 - 1993 - 1994 - 1995 - 1996 - 1997 - 1998 - 1999 - 2000 - 2001 - 2002 - 2003 - 2004 - 2005 - 2006 - 2007 - 2008 - 2009 - 2010 - 2011 - 2012 - 2013 - 2014 - 2015 - 2016 - 2017 - 2018 - 2019 - 2020 - 2021 - 2022 -

History of Russia, by Region

Republics 
History of Adygea
History of the Altai Republic
History of Bashkortostan
History of Buryatia
History of Chechnya
History of Chuvashia
History of Dagestan
History of Ingushetia
History of Kabardino-Balkaria
History of Kalmykia
History of Karachay-Cherkessia
History of the Republic of Karelia
History of Khakassia
History of the Komi Republic
History of Mari El
History of Mordovia
History of North Ossetia–Alania
History of the Sakha Republic
History of Tatarstan
History of Tuva
History of Udmurtia

Krais 
History of Altai Krai
History of Kamchatka Krai
History of Khabarovsk Krai
History of Krasnodar Krai
History of Krasnoyarsk Krai
History of Perm Krai
History of Primorsky Krai
History of Stavropol Krai
History of Zabaykalsky Krai

Oblasts 
History of Amur Oblast
History of Arkhangelsk Oblast
History of Astrakhan Oblast
History of Belgorod Oblast
History of Bryansk Oblast
History of Chelyabinsk Oblast
History of Irkutsk Oblast
History of Ivanovo Oblast
History of Kaliningrad Oblast
History of Kaluga Oblast
History of Kemerovo Oblast
History of Kirov Oblast
History of Kostroma Oblast
History of Kurgan Oblast
History of Kursk Oblast
History of Leningrad Oblast
History of Lipetsk Oblast
History of Magadan Oblast
History of Moscow Oblast
History of Murmansk Oblast
History of Nizhny Novgorod Oblast
History of Novgorod Oblast
History of Novosibirsk Oblast
History of Omsk Oblast
History of Orenburg Oblast
History of Oryol Oblast
History of Penza Oblast
History of Pskov Oblast
History of Rostov Oblast
History of Ryazan Oblast
History of Sakhalin Oblast
History of Samara Oblast
History of Saratov Oblast
History of Smolensk Oblast
History of Sverdlovsk Oblast
History of Tambov Oblast
History of Tomsk Oblast
History of Tula Oblast
History of Tver Oblast
History of Tyumen Oblast
History of Ulyanovsk Oblast
History of Vladimir Oblast
History of Volgograd Oblast
History of Vologda Oblast
History of Voronezh Oblast
History of Yaroslavl Oblast

Federal cities 
 History of Moscow
 History of Saint Petersburg

History of Russia, by subject 
 History of Russian culture
 Economic history of the Russian Federation
 The Development of Capitalism in Russia
 Earthquakes in Russia
 Film history of Russia
 History of Russian animation
 History of Freemasonry in Russia
 History of Germans in Russia, Ukraine and the Soviet Union
 History of innovation in Russia
 History of international law in Russia
 History of the Internet in Russia
 History of the Jews in Russia
 The Holocaust in Russia
 LGBT history in Russia
 McDonald's in Russia
 Monarchism in Russia
 Military history of Russia
 Red Army
 Postage stamps and postal history of Russia
 History of rail transport in Russia
 History of the Russian language
 The Sexual Revolution in Russia
 Serfdom in Russia
 Slavery in Russia
 Witch trials in Russia

Culture of Russia 

 Cuisine of Russia
 Cultural icons of Russia
 Festivals in Russia
 Funerals in Russia
 Humor in Russia
 Languages of Russia
 Russian language
 LGBT culture in Russia
 Material culture in Russia
 Media in Russia
 Museums in Russia
 National symbols of Russia
 Coat of arms of Russia
 Flag of Russia
 List of Russian flags
 National anthem of Russia
 People of Russia
 Famous Russians
 Prostitution in Russia
 Public holidays in Russia
 Records of Russia
 Russian folklore
 Russian martial arts
 World Heritage Sites in Russia
 Scouting in Russia
 Surnames in Russia
 Time in Russia
 Date and time notation in Russia
 UFO sightings in Russia
 Video games in Russia
 Women in Russia
 Feminism in Russia

The arts in Russia 

 Art in Russia
 Russian avant-garde
 Graffiti in Russia
 Ballet in Russia
 Cinema of Russia
 Literature of Russia
 Music of Russia
 Rock music in Russia
 Television in Russia
 Theatre in Russia
 Opera in Russia

Architecture of Russia 
Architecture of Russia
 Russian architecture
 Art Nouveau Architecture in Russia
 Russian church architecture
 Cathedrals in Russia
 Lighthouses in Russia
 Neoclassical architecture in Russia
 Russian neoclassical revival
 Russian Revival architecture
 Stalinist Architecture
 Tallest buildings in Russia

Ethnic groups in Russia 
 Afghans in Russia
 Armenians in Russia
 Assyrians in Russia
 Azerbaijanis in Russia
 Belarusians in Russia
 Ethnic Chinese in Russia
 Georgians in Russia
 Indians in Russia
 Iranians in Russia
 Japanese people in Russia
 Kazakhs in Russia
 Kurds in Russia
 Moldovans in Russia
 Latvians in Russia
 Nepalis in Russia
 North Koreans in Russia
 Serbs in Russia
 Turks in Russia
 Ukrainians in Russia
 Uzbeks in Russia
 Vietnamese people in Russia

Sports in Russia 

Sports in Russia

 Athletics in Russia
 Cricket in Russia
 Curling clubs in Russia
 Golf in Russia
 Rugby in Russia (disambiguation)
 Rugby league in Russia
 Rugby union in Russia
 Sports broadcasting contracts in Russia
 Volleyball in Russia

Football in Russia 

Football in Russia (disambiguation)
 Football clubs in Russia
 Football clubs in Russia by competitive honours won
 Football derbies in Russia
 Football stadiums in Russia
 Football records and statistics in Russia
 Footballer of the Year in Russia (disambiguation)
 Footballer of the Year in Russia (Futbol)
 Footballer of the Year in Russia (Sport-Express)
 Women's football in Russia

Religion in Russia 

Religion in Russia
 Buddhism in Russia
 Christianity in Russia
 Armenian churches in Russia
 Baháʼí Faith in Russia
 Russian Orthodox Church
 Bible Society in Russia
 Cathedrals in Russia
 Catholic Church in Russia
 Catholic dioceses in Russia
 Christmas in Russia
 The Church of Jesus Christ of Latter-day Saints in Russia
 Protestantism in Russia
 Union of Evangelical Reformed Churches in Russia
 Hinduism in Russia
 Irreligion in Russia
 Islam in Russia
 Judaism in Russia
 Synagogues in Russia
 Scientology in Russia
 Sikhism in Russia
 Slavic Native Faith in Russia
 Zoroastrianism in Russia

Economy and infrastructure of Russia 

Economy of Russia
 Economic rank, by nominal GDP (2008): eighth
 Companies of Russia
 The Development of Capitalism in Russia
Currency of Russia: Ruble
ISO 4217: RUB
 Economic history of Russia
 Russian Industrial Leaders Index
 Russia Stock Exchange
 Social security system in Russia
 Social entrepreneurship in Russia
 Special Economic Zones in Russia
 Taxation in Russia
 Types of business entity in Russia
 Unemployment in Russia

Industries and economic sectors in Russia 

 Agriculture in Russia
 Fishing industry in Russia
 Banking in Russia
 Central Bank of Russia
 Chemical industry in Russia
 Defense industry of Russia
 Health care in Russia
 Pharmaceutical industry in Russia
 Mining in Russia
 Mines in Russia
 Petroleum industry in Russia
 Retail industry in Russia
 Grocery retailing in Russia
 Supermarket chains in Russia
 Tourism in Russia
 Waste management in Russia
 Water supply and sanitation in Russia

Communications in Russia 
 Mass media in Russia
 Newspapers in Russia
 Telecommunications in Russia
 Internet in Russia
 History of the Internet in Russia
 Telephone numbers in Russia
 Television in Russia
 Russian-language television channels

Energy in Russia 
Energy in Russia
 Coal in Russia
 Energy policy of Russia
 Oil industry in Russia
 Power stations in Russia
 Renewable energy in Russia
 Geothermal power in Russia
 Wind power in Russia

Transport in Russia 
Transport in Russia
 Air transport in Russia
 Airports in Russia
 Rail transport in Russia
 Railway lines in Russia
 Busiest railway stations in Russia
 Trolleybus systems in Russia
 History of rail transport in Russia
 Road transport in Russia
 Roads in Russia
 Motorways in Russia
 Road signs in Russia
 Maritime transport in Russia
 Canals in Russia
 Lighthouses in Russia
 Shipbuilding in Russia
 Urban electric transport in Russia

Education in Russia 

Education in Russia
 Academic grading in Russia
 Academic ranks in Russia
 Institutions of higher education in Russia
 Law schools in Russia
 Medical schools in Russia
 Military academies in Russia
 Museums in Russia

Health in Russia 

Health in Russia
 Alcohol consumption in Russia
 Healthcare in Russia
 HIV/AIDS in Russia
 Hospitals in Russia
 Medical schools in Russia
 Mental health in Russia
 Pharmaceutical industry in Russia
 Suicide in Russia
 Women's reproductive health in Russia

See also 

List of international rankings
Member state of the Group of Twenty Finance Ministers and Central Bank Governors
Member state of the United Nations
Outline of Asia
Outline of Europe
Outline of geography

References

External links 

Russia
Outline